Charles Todd (28 May 1868 – 21 August 1942) was a New Zealand businessman and was a principal founder of the Todd Corporation. He was a committed Catholic and prohibitionist.

References

Sources
Tony Nightingale, Charles Todd (1868–1942), The Dictionary of New Zealand Biography (retrieved 1 March 2011).

1868 births
1942 deaths
New Zealand people of Irish descent
Scottish emigrants to New Zealand
New Zealand Roman Catholics
New Zealand businesspeople
Unsuccessful candidates in the 1931 New Zealand general election
Unsuccessful candidates in the 1928 New Zealand general election
Charles
Todd Corporation
People from Peebles